Ligia del Consuelo Vega Olmedo is an Ecuadorian politician for the Pachakutik Plurinational Unity Movement – New Country party. She is a member of the National Assembly of Ecuador.

Life
Vega gained her first degree as Bachelor of Accounting and Auditing from the Technical University of Ambato.

She is a politician for the Pachakutik Plurinational Unity Movement – New Country party. She was elected to the National Assembly of Ecuador. She studied organisation development at the Autonomous Regional University
of the Andes until 2010. In 2015 she gained her master's degree at the Autonomous Regional University of Los Andes in Business Management.

She was elected in 2021 to represent the Province of Morona Santiago. Before that that she worked for the Association of Provincial Autonomous Governments of the Amazon after being President of an organisation marketing Amazonian products.

She was elected to be the vice-president of the National Assembly's Biodiversity and Natural Resources Commission. Washington Varela Salazar is the president and the other members are Vanessa Álava, Efrén Calapucha, Gissella Molina,Rebeca Veloz, Pedro Zapata, Fredy Rojas Cuenca and Fernanda Mabel Méndez Rojas.

References

Living people
Year of birth missing (living people)
21st-century Ecuadorian women politicians
21st-century Ecuadorian politicians
Members of the National Assembly (Ecuador)
Women members of the National Assembly (Ecuador)